Chubulga is a populated place in Yakutia, Russia.

References

Populated places in the Sakha Republic